Ketzal's Corridors, known in PAL regions as SpeedThru: Potzol's Puzzle and in Japan as , is a puzzle video game, developed by Keys Factory and published by Nintendo. It was released on the Nintendo 3DS via the Nintendo eShop. The game is a follow-up to Keys Factory's ThruSpace, released on WiiWare in 2010.

Gameplay
The game is described as a "third-person on-rails Tetris," with the player having to move a 3-4 block shape, attempting to get through each hole without missing, and using a variety of strategic movements to the block to progress efficiently through the level. The setting of the game is based on the Aztec, the ethnic groups of central Mexico that lived during the 14th–16th centuries.

Reception

The game received "generally favorable reviews" according to the review aggregation website Metacritic. IGN called it "brilliant and highly addictive". Official Nintendo Magazine called it "excellent". Edge found it fun in short bursts but warned that extended play could cause eye strain.

References

External links
  (English)
  (Japanese)
 

2011 video games
Nintendo games
Nintendo 3DS games
Nintendo 3DS-only games
Nintendo 3DS eShop games
Puzzle video games
Video games developed in Japan